Angus MacColl is a Scottish bagpipe player.

Life
He was born in Benderloch, near Oban, and initially learnt the pipes from his father. MacColl is descended from a number of famous pipers, including John MacColl. His son Angus J. MacColl is also a competitive piper.

He teaches at the Oban High School.

Career
MacColl won Gold Medals at both the Northern Meeting and Argyllshire Gathering. He also won the former winners Clasp at the Northern Meeting, several Ceòl Beag prizes, and the Metro Cup, in 2012. Additionally, he won the Glenfiddich Championships four times, in 1995, 2006, 2010 and 2015.

He played with the Spirit of Scotland Pipe Band when it formed in 2008 and 2016.

References

Great Highland bagpipe players
Living people
People from Oban
Gold Medal winners (bagpipes)
Scottish bagpipe players
Year of birth missing (living people)